Peruveleon is a genus of antlions in the family Myrmeleontidae. There are about five described species in Peruveleon.

Species
These five species belong to the genus Peruveleon:
 Peruveleon bruneri (Alayo, 1968)
 Peruveleon camposi (Banks, 1908)
 Peruveleon dolichogaster (Navás, 1915)
 Peruveleon dorsalis (Banks, 1903)
 Peruveleon indiges (Walker, 1860)

References

Further reading

 

Myrmeleontidae
Articles created by Qbugbot